MMDA-2 (2-methoxy-4,5-methylenedioxyamphetamine) is a psychedelic drug of the amphetamine class. It is closely related to MMDA and MDA.

Alexander Shulgin was likely the first to synthesize MMDA-2. In his book PiHKAL, the dose is listed as 25–50 mg, and the duration is listed as 8–12 hours. Shulgin reports that MMDA-2 produces effects such as enhanced awareness, empathy, and visual facilitation and distortion, as well as some side effects like gastrointestinal upset and appetite loss. He states that 30 mg is very similar to 80 mg of MDA, and also remarks that it would be impossible for anyone to have a bad experience on the drug at that dose.

Scientific research has shown that MMDA-2, unlike MMDA, but similarly to 6-methyl-MDA, is only very weak at inducing the release of serotonin or dopamine, and accordingly, does not produce amphetamine-like responses in animals in drug discrimination studies. Instead, MMDA-2 is likely to act as a pure 5-HT2 receptor agonist similarly to the DOx series of compounds, with activation of the 5-HT2A receptor conferring its psychedelic effects.

MMDA-2 has been sold as a designer drug in Japan.

References

External links 
 Erowid - PiHKAL entry for MMDA-2
 Isomerdesign - PiHKAL entry for MMDA-2

Substituted amphetamines
Designer drugs
Benzodioxoles
Entactogens and empathogens
Serotonin receptor agonists
Phenol ethers